Gemmobacter nectariphilus is a bacterium from the genus of Gemmobacter which has been isolated from activated sludge from Japan.

References 

Rhodobacteraceae
Bacteria described in 2004